Sandy Creek is a  long 4th order tributary to the Deep River in Guilford and Randolph Counties, North Carolina.  The Battle of the Mouth of Sandy Creek occurred at the mouth of this creek in July 1781.

Course
Sandy Creek rises in a pond about 1 mile east of Climax, North Carolina in Guilford County and then flows south into Randolph County to join the Deep River in Ramseur, North Carolina.

Watershed
Sandy Creek drains  of area, receives about 46.8 in/year of precipitation, and has a wetness index of 393.40 and is about 48% forested.

See also
List of rivers of North Carolina

References

Rivers of North Carolina
Rivers of Guilford County, North Carolina
Rivers of Randolph County, North Carolina